Elastic Press was a British small press specialising in single-author short story collections. It was run by Andrew Hook between November 2002 and November 2008 and was based in Norwich.

In 2005 and 2009 Elastic received British Fantasy Awards for Best Small Press. They also won the British Fantasy Society Best Anthology award in 2005, 2006, and 2007. In 2008, their title Other Voices by Andrew Humphrey won an East Anglian Book award. In 2009, their title The Turing Test by Chris Beckett won the Edge Hill Short Story Prize, beating many Booker-nominated authors to do so.

In 2017 NewCon Press published an anthology Elasticity - The Best of Elastic Press edited by Andrew Hook as an A5 paperback and a numbered limited edition hardback signed by the editor.

Books Published by Elastic Press 
Six Silly Stories by Geoffrey Maloney
Subtle Edens: An Anthology of Slipstream Fiction edited by Allen Ashley
The Turing Test by Chris Beckett
The Last Reef by Gareth L Powell
Binding Energy by Daniel Marcus
Another Santana Morning by Mike Dolan
Other Voices by Andrew Humphrey
The Cusp of Something by Jai Clare
That's Entertainment by Robert Neilson
Going Back by Tony Richards
So Far, So Near by Mat Coward
Photocopies of Heaven by Maurice Suckling
Extended Play edited by Gary Couzens
Unbecoming by Mike O'Driscoll
The Ephemera by Neil Williamson
The Last Days of Johnny North by David Swann
The English Soil Society by Tim Nickels
Trailer Park Fairy Tales by Matt Dinniman
The Life To Come by Tim Lees
The Elastic Book of Numbers, an anthology edited by Allen Ashley
Visits To The Flea Circus by Nick Jackson
Angel Road by Steven Savile
Somnambulists by Allen Ashley
The Sound of White Ants by Brian Howell
Jung's People by Kay Green
The Alsiso Project, anthology edited by Andrew Hook
Milo and I by Antony Mann
Sleepwalkers by Marion Arnott
Second Contact by Gary Couzens
Open The Box by Andrew Humphrey
The Virtual Menagerie by Andrew Hook

References

External links 
 Review of The Sound of White Ants by Brian Howell

British speculative fiction publishers
Science fiction publishers